Alfred Hales (1909–1998) was a Canadian politician.

Alfred Hales may also refer to:
Alfred Arthur Greenwood Hales (1860–1936), Australian novelist and war correspondent
Alfred W. Hales (born 1938), American mathematician

See also
Alfie Hale (born 1939), Irish footballer